The men's ice hockey tournament at the 1924 Winter Olympics in Chamonix, France, was the second Olympic Championship, also serving as the second World Championships. The competition was held from Monday, January 28, 1924, to Sunday, February 3, 1924. Canada, represented by the Toronto Granites, defended its championship from the 1920 Summer Olympics. The United States and Great Britain took the silver and bronze respectively, while other contenders included Czechoslovakia, France, and Sweden.

The Bergvall system used in the 1920 Olympics was discarded in favor of a two-level round-robin tournament. Qualifying teams were placed in pools for the opening round, with the top two teams in each pool advancing to the final round. The medals were awarded based on the record in the final round. This format would remain in use until the 1992 Winter Olympics, when the final round-robin was replaced with a medal-round single-elimination tournament.

The Canadian Amateur Hockey Association (CAHA) chose the Toronto Granites as the 1923 Allan Cup champions to represent Canada, and W. A. Hewitt was chosen oversee the national team's finances at the Olympics. Hewitt was empowered by the CAHA to name replacement players as needed, and recruited Harold McMunn and Cyril Slater as replacements when four players from the Granites were unable to travel to the Olympics. In his weekly report to the Toronto Daily Star, Hewitt wrote that the Granites would face multiple changes in conditions compared to hockey games in Canada. He did not feel the team would be affected by playing outdoors on natural ice in the morning or afternoon, despite that the team was accustomed to playing indoors with electric lighting on artificial ice. He also felt that the larger ice surface and lack of boards around the sides of the rink would mean more stick handling and less physical play.

Austria was eligible to compete after having been excluded in 1920, but they withdrew just before the tournament due to the ineligibility of three international players.

Medalists

Participating nations

A total of 82(*) ice hockey players from eight nations competed at the Chamonix Games:
 
 
 
 
 
 
 
 

(*) NOTE: Only counts players who participated in at least one game. Not all reserve players are known.

Final tournament

First round

Group A

Group B

Final round

Note: The CAN v SWE and USA v GBR games were carried forward from the previous round.

When the Olympics organizers wanted to select hockey referees by drawing names out of a hat, Hewitt and United States Amateur Hockey Association president William S. Haddock agreed to a coin toss to decide on the referee for the game between Canada and the United States men's national team. Hewitt feared having an inexperienced referee for the game, and his suggested to have Ligue Internationale de Hockey sur Glace (LIHG) president Paul Loicq officiate the game was confirmed by the coin toss. The Granites defeated the United States team by a 6–1 score, and won all six games played to be the Olympic gold medallists.

Statistics

Average age
Team Czechoslovakia was the oldest team in the tournament, averaging 31 years and 5 months. Team Belgium was the youngest team in the tournament, averaging 24 years and 1 months. Gold medalists Canada averaged 25 years and 2 months. Tournament average was 27 years and 11 months.

Top scorer

Final ranking

 These standings are presented as the IIHF has them, however the IOC does not rank the teams below 4th

References

Sources

External links
 1924 Olympic Games report. pp. 704–711 (in French) (digitized copy online)
 International Olympic Committee results database

 
Olympics
1924 Winter Olympics events
1924
Olympics
1924
1924